Internationale is the first EP by experimental indie band Brainiac, released on October 10, 1995. It was their first release after signing to Touch & Go Records and was produced by Kim Deal of The Pixies.

Track listing
 "Go Freaks Go" – 2:24
 "Silver Iodine" – 2:59
 "Simon Says" – 5:22

References

1995 EPs
Touch and Go Records EPs
Brainiac (band) EPs